Road signs in Turkey conform to the general pattern of those used in most other European countries. They are regulated by the Trafik İşaretleri Elkitabi (Traffic Street Code).

Road signs

See also 
 Comparison of European road signs

References

Turkey